Yurukikos or Yurukiko is a Greek instrumental dance from Agiasos, Lesbos, Greece, with a nine beat rhythm. The dance has many similarities with antikristos dance. The tune take its name from the Yörüks, the Turkish nomadic tribe.

The dance can be also compared with Greek rebetiko dances of that time.

See also
Antikristos
Greek dances
Music of Greece
Rebetiko

External links 
Musipedia: Γιουρούκικο

European folk dances
Greek dances